Saint-Jean-du-Gard is a commune in the Gard department in southern France.

History
This city of the Cévennes, first mentioned in a 12th-century papal bull (San Johannis de Gardonnenca cum villa), was very much influenced by Protestantism in the 16th century and became the Mecca of the camisards' resistance.

Thanks to the silk industry, the village experienced a period of prosperity that lasted from the 19th century to the 20th century.  This city now owes much of its economy to tourism. A heritage railway runs from Saint-Jean-du-Gard to Anduze with a stop at the Bambouseraie de Prafrance, which attracts 150,000 tourists a year.

The Scottish author Robert Louis Stevenson reached the town on 3 October 1878, as recounted in his book Travels with a Donkey in the Cévennes. Here he sold his donkey Modestine, and took a stagecoach to Alès:

The Robert Louis Stevenson Trail (GR 70), a popular long-distance path following Stevenson's approximate route, finishes in the town at a fountain built to commemorate Stevenson's arrival.

Geography

Climate

Saint-Jean-du-Gard has a hot-summer Mediterranean climate (Köppen climate classification Csa).

Population

See also
Communes of the Gard department
List of works by Auguste Carli

References

External links

 Official site 

Communes of Gard